Clivina erugatella is a species of ground beetle in the subfamily Scaritinae. It was described by Darlington in 1962.

References

erugatella
Beetles described in 1962